2001 in the Philippines details events of note that happened in the Philippines in the year 2001.

Incumbents

 President
Joseph Estrada (LAMMP) (until January 20)
Gloria Macapagal Arroyo (Lakas) (starting January 20)
 Vice President
Gloria Macapagal Arroyo (Lakas) (until January 20)
Teofisto Guingona (Lakas) (starting January 20)
 Senate President:
Aquilino Pimentel (until June 30)
Franklin Drilon (starting June 30)
 House Speaker: 
Arnulfo Fuentabella (until January 20)
Feliciano Belmonte, Jr. (January 20-Jun 30)
Jose C. de Venecia, Jr. (starting June 30)
 Chief Justice: Hilario Davide, Jr.
 Philippine Congress
11th Congress of the Philippines (until June 8)
12th Congress of the Philippines (starting July 23)

Events

January
 January 12 – The cityhood of Valencia, Bukidnon is ratified in a plebiscite for Republic Act 8985, which was approved on December 5, 2000.
 January 16 – After 11 senators voted not to open the second envelope, which containing the documents against President Estrada, the prosecutors walk out.
 January 17 – 20 – Second EDSA Revolution. Millions of people march in the streets of EDSA for a peaceful protest against President Estrada for being accused of plunder.
 January 20:
 Vice President Gloria Macapagal Arroyo takes the oath of office as the 14th president of the Philippines. She is considered as the second female president after Corazon Aquino.
 Estrada steps down as the 13th President of the Philippines from his office in Malacañan Palace.
 January 22 – Vigan becomes a city in the province of Ilocos Sur through ratification of Republic Act 8988 which was approved on December 27, 2000.

February
 February 3 – San Fernando becomes a city in the province of Pampanga through ratification of Republic Act 8990 which was approved on January 26.

March
 March 10 – Tanauan becomes a city in the province of Batangas through ratification of Republic Act 9005 which was approved on February 2.
 March 24
 Ligao becomes a city in the province of Albay through ratification of Republic Act 9008 which was approved on February 21.
 Tabaco becomes a city in the province of Albay through ratification of Republic Act 9020 which was approved on March 5.
 March 28
 Alaminos becomes a city in the province of Pangasinan through ratification of Republic Act 9025 which was approved on March 5.
 Candon becomes a city in the province of Ilocos Sur through ratification of Republic Act 9018 which was approved on March 5.
 March 30 – The cityhood of Cauayan, Isabela is ratified in a plebiscite for Republic Act 9017, which has approved on Feb. 28.
 March 31
 Escalante becomes a city in the province of Negros Occidental through ratification of Republic Act 9014 which was approved on February 28.
 Himamaylan becomes a city in the province of Negros Occidental through ratification of Republic Act 9028 which was approved on March 5.
 Panabo becomes a city in the province of Davao del Norte through ratification of Republic Act 9015 which was approved on February 28.
 Sipalay becomes a city in the province of Negros Occidental through ratification of Republic Act 9027 which was approved on March 5.

April
 April 21
 Calamba becomes a city in the province of Laguna through ratification of Republic Act 9024 which was approved on March 5.
 Malabon becomes a highly urbanized city in Metro Manila through ratification of Republic Act 9019 which was approved on March 5.
 April 25
 Estrada is arrested in San Juan following a protest by his supporters and detained at Camp Crame.
 Isabela becomes a city in the province of Basilan through ratification of Republic Act 9023 which was approved on March 5.

May
 May 1 – Estrada supporters attack Malacañan Palace following a riot, killing many and several others were rounded up by the police.
 May 14 – Legislative and local elections are held nationwide.
 May 27 – Twenty tourists are abducted by the Abu Sayyaf Group (ASG) terrorists from a popular island resort in Palawan and later taken hostage; some of them are killed; crisis lasts about 12 months.

August
August 2 – ASG members attack a predominantly Christian village in Lamitan, Basilan, with 11 of 32 kidnapped villagers were killed.
August 18 – A fire swept through the Manor Hotel in Quezon City and killed at least 68 people.
 August 25 – Gapan becomes a city in the province of Nueva Ecija through ratification of Republic Act 9022 which was approved on March 5.

November
 November 17 – New People's Army guerrillas ambush an Army Special Forces platoon in Cateel, Davao Oriental; 18 government troopers and 10 NPA rebels are killed.

Holidays

As per Executive Order No. 292, chapter 7 section 26, the following are regular holidays and special days, approved on July 25, 1987. Note that in the list, holidays in bold are "regular holidays" and those in italics are "nationwide special days".

 January 1 – New Year's Day
 April 9 – Araw ng Kagitingan (Day of Valor)
 April 12 – Maundy Thursday
 April 13 – Good Friday
 May 1 – Labor Day
 June 12 – Independence Day 
 August 26 – National Heroes Day
 November 1 –  All Saints Day
 November 30 – Bonifacio Day
 December 25 – Christmas Day
 December 30 – Rizal Day
 December 31 – Last Day of the Year

In addition, several other places observe local holidays, such as the foundation of their town. These are also "special days."

Business and economy
September – Digital Mobile Philippines launches Sun Cellular to provide wireless public and private telecommunications services.

Sports
 March 30–April 1 – The Philippines hosts the 2001 Asian Beach Volleyball Championship.
 May 18 – The San Miguel Beermen captures their 16th PBA title, winning their finals series against the Barangay Ginebra Kings in game 6 of the 2001 PBA All-Filipino Cup.
 August 24 – Batang Red Bull Thunder wins the Commissioner's Cup title in only their second season and fifth conference. The Thunder defeats San Miguel Beermen in Game Six for a 4–2 series victory.
 September 8–17 – The country's athletes compete in the 2001 Southeast Asian Games which was held in Kuala Lumpur, Malaysia.
 December 16 – The Sta. Lucia Realtors captures its first-ever PBA title after 8 years of participation in the league, winning over defending champions San Miguel Beermen in six games.

Television

Births
 January 6
 Cassy Legaspi, actress
 Mavy Legaspi, actor
 February 5 – Juan Karlos Labajo, The Voice Kids finalist
 February 13 – Jelay Pilones, housemate
 February 15 – Angeli Nicole Sanoy, actress
 March 6 – Rere Madrid, actress
 March 28 – Missy Quino, actress and housemate
 April 27 – Akira Morishita, actor, singer, and member of BGYO
 April 29 – Faith Da Silva, actress
 May 24 – Darren Espanto, singer
 August 3 – Agnes "Angeli" Khang, Filipino-Korean actress and former model
 August 16 – Lianne Valentin, actress
 August 23 – Zaijian Jaranilla, actor
 October 31 – Amy Nobleza, singer and actress
 November 7 – Grae Fernandez, actor
 December 19 – Mika Gorospe, singer

Deaths
 March 10 – Arturo Alcaraz, volcanologist (b. 1916)
 March 13 – Encarnacion Alzona, historian, educator and suffragist. (b. 1895)
 August 19 – Felicisimo Fajardo, Olympic basketball player (b. 1915)
 October 3 – Alfie Almario, basketball player (b. 1963)
 October 12 – Eddie Rodriguez, film director (b. 1932)
 November 7 – Nida Blanca, actress (b. 1936)
 November 8 – Valentin Eduque, basketball coach and player (b. 1927)
 November 23 – Maria Teresa Carlson, actress (b. 1963)

References

 
2001 in Southeast Asia
Philippines
2000s in the Philippines
Years of the 21st century in the Philippines